The Escambray rebellion was an armed conflict from 1959 to 1965 in the Escambray Mountains during which several insurgent groups fought against the Cuban government led by Fidel Castro. The military operation against the rebellion was called the Struggle Against Bandits (or LCB) by the Cuban government.

The rebels were a mix of former Batista soldiers, local farmers, and leftist ex-guerrillas who had fought alongside Castro against Batista during the Cuban Revolution. The end result was the elimination of all insurgents by Cuban government forces in 1965.

Beginning
The uprising began almost immediately after the success of the Cuban Revolution in 1959. It was led by an ex-guerrilla that had fought against Batista before, but rejected the socialist turn the Cuban Revolution had taken and the ensuing close ties with the Soviet Union. Small landowning farmers, who disagreed with the socialist government's collectivization of Cuban farmlands also played a central role in the failed rebellion. The uprising was also secretly backed by the CIA and the Eisenhower administration because of Castro's ties with the Soviet Union.

The insurgent guajiro rural farmers were aided by some former Batista forces but were led mostly by former DRE rebels (13 March Movement), such as the anti-communists Osvaldo Ramirez and Comandante William Alexander Morgan, both of whom had fought Batista's casquitos in the same area only a few years before (Morgan himself was executed in 1961, long before the resistance ended). Ramirez and Morgan were viewed by the United States as potential pro-democracy options for Cuba and sent CIA-trained Cuban exiles to promote and spread word of them being an alternative to Castro.

Insurgency
The CIA provided some aid to the insurgents but withdrew all support after the failed Bay of Pigs Invasion in 1961, ensuring their ultimate defeat. Some of the failures could be attributed to Castro's "roll up" of CIA operatives in Cuba. After the Bay of Pigs failure, Osvaldo Ramirez returned to the Escambray Mountains and declined an offer by Castro's emissary, Comandante Faure Chomón, to surrender. 

The main tactic of the Cuban government was to deploy thousands of troops against small groups of rebels, forming progressively-constricting rings of encirclement. The communist leaders that Castro sent to clear the Escambray Mountains were ordered to exterminate the rebels. They were to "comb the brush elbow to elbow" until they had completely cleared the hills of anti-communist rebels. The leaders of the Lucha contra bandidos counter-insurgency forces were Commandantes Raul Menendez Tomassevich, a founding member of the Communist Party of Cuba, and Lizardo Proenza.

Defeat
Both their smaller numbers and the lack of outside assistance, particularly supplies, eventually led to the rebels' defeat. Cuban forces used sweeps by long columns of militia, which cost the government substantial losses but ultimately won the war. The Spanish-Soviet advisor Francisco Ciutat de Miguel, who was also present at the Bay of Pigs Invasion, played a major role in the pacification operation. Castro employed overwhelming force, at times sending in as many as 250,000 men, almost all of whom (including 3,500 out of the 4,000 government fatalities) were militia. The insurgency was eventually crushed by the Castro's use of their vastly-superior numbers. Some of the insurgents ultimately surrendered but were immediately executed by firing squad. Only a handful managed to escape.

Legacy
The War Against the Bandits lasted longer and involved more soldiers than the previous struggle against Batista's forces.

Raúl Castro claimed in a speech in 1970 that the rebellion killed 500 members of the Cuban Revolutionary Armed Forces. The death toll of the rebels and others involved in the rebellion (such as civilians and pro-government militias) is unknown. Estimates for total combatant deaths range from 1,000 to 7,000.

See also
 Basmachi movement, a similar rebellion in Central Asia during the Russian Civil War
 Black Spring
 Maleconazo

References

Sources
 
 De la Cova, Antonio Rafael. 2007. The Moncada Attack: Birth of the Cuban Revolution. University of South Carolina Press. , p. 314 note 47.
 Dreke, Victor (Edited by Mary-Alice Waters) 2002. From el Escambray to the Congo. Pathfinder Press, New York. , .
 Encinosa, Enrique G. 1989. El Escopetero Chapter in Escambray: La Guerra Olvidada, Un Libro Historico de Los Combatientes Anticastristas en Cuba (1960–1966). Editorial SIBI, Miami.
 Encinosa, Enrique G. 2004. Unvanquished – Cuba's Resistance to Fidel Castro, Pureplay Press, Los Angeles, pp. 73–86. .
 Faria, Miguel A. Cuba in Revolution – Escape from a Lost Paradise. Hacienda Publishing, Macon, GA, pp. 88–93. .
 Fermoselle, Rafael 1992. Cuban Leadership after Castro: Biographies of Cuba's Top Commanders, North-South Center, University of Miami, Research Institute for Cuban Studies; 2nd ed (paperback) .
 Franqui, Carlos 1984 (foreword by G. Cabrera Infante and translated by Alfred MacAdam from Spanish 1981 version). Family portrait with Fidel, Random House First Vintage Books, New York.  .
 Priestland, Jane (editor) 2003. British Archives on Cuba: Cuba under Castro 1959–1962. Archival Publications International Limited, 2003, London .
 Puebla, Teté (Brigadier General of the Cuban Armed Forces) 2003. Marianas in Combat: the Mariana Grajales Women's Platoon in Cuba's Revolutionary War 1956–58, New York Pathfinder (Paperback) .
 Ros, Enrique 2006. El Clandestinaje y la Lucha Armada Contra Castro (The clandestinity and the armed fight against Castro), Ediciones Universal, Miami .
 Volkman, Ernest 1995. "Our man in Havana. Cuban double agents 1961–1987" in Espionage: The Greatest Spy Operations of the Twentieth Century, Wiley, New York  .

20th-century rebellions
Aftermath of the Cuban Revolution
Opposition to Fidel Castro
Peasant revolts
1960s in Cuba
Rebellions in Cuba
Cienfuegos Province
Sancti Spíritus Province
Villa Clara Province
Cold War rebellions
Communism-based civil wars
Counter-revolutionaries
Conflicts in 1959
Conflicts in 1960
Conflicts in 1961
Conflicts in 1962
Conflicts in 1963
Conflicts in 1964
Conflicts in 1965
1959 in Cuba
1960 in Cuba
1961 in Cuba
1962 in Cuba
1963 in Cuba
1964 in Cuba
1965 in Cuba
1959 establishments in Cuba
1965 disestablishments in Cuba